Grič Tunnel may refer to:

 Grič Tunnel (Zagreb), a pedestrian tunnel under the historic core of Zagreb, Croatia
 Grič Tunnel (roadway), a road tunnel, part of the A1 motorway in Croatia